Contrary may refer to:

 Contrary (comics), a character from Malibu Comics' Ultraverse
 Contrary (logic), the relationship between two propositions when they cannot both be true
 Contrary Magazine, a literary journal founded at the University of Chicago
 Contrary motion, in music theory
 Contrary (social role), in certain Amerindian cultures
 Contrary (venture capital firm), a San Francisco-based venture capital firm
 Little Miss Contrary, a Little Miss character

See also
 Contrary Creek (disambiguation), several watercourses
To the Contrary, PBS all-female news analysis series
 Opposite (disambiguation)